is a Japanese professional footballer who plays as a striker for Albanian club Kamza.

Club career

Gainare Tottori
In 2011, he joined Gainare Tottori in J2 League, on 6 March 2011 he made his first appearance for the team.

Home United
In 2013 the striker signed for Home United on a free transfer. He played thirteen games in the S.League without scoring.

Sutjeska Nikšić
On 26 July 2013, Fukui signed for Montenegrin First League side Sutjeska Nikšić on a free transfer. He made his debut on 10 August, scoring in a 2–0 win over Mornar. He scored a goal from 70 metres against FK Mladost for 2–0 win.

Tirana
On 16 July 2015, Fukui joined Albanian Superliga side Tirana on a free transfer, signing a one-year contract and becoming the first Japanese player to sign for an Albanian club. In his unofficial debut on 22 July, he came on the field and scored twice to lead his team into a 2–1 win against Mladost Carev Dvor in the first match of the preparation phase in Macedonia.

On 23 August 2015, in the Tirana's opening match of the 2015–16 season against the newcomers of Tërbuni Pukë, Fukui gave an assist for Gilman Lika to score an equalizer, which ended Tërbuni's superiority, and then scored the winning goal in the 68th minute, giving Tirana a 1–2 away win.

Skënderbeu Korçë
On 21 June 2016, Fukui signed a two-year contract with fellow Albanian Superliga side Skënderbeu Korçë after he couldn't reach an argument with Tirana for the new deal. Due to Skënderbeu's ban from European football over match-fixing allegations, on 10 July, Fukui was sent on loan at Kukësi for their European campaign along with teammates Liridon Latifi and Sabjen Lilaj.

Four days later, he played 82 minutes in the first leg of UEFA Europa League second qualifying round against Austria Wien which ended in a 1–0 defeat. He also featured 61 minutes in the second leg at Elbasan Arena as the match finished in a 1–4 defeat, which confirmed Kukësi elimination from the competition with the aggregate 1–5.

After Kukësi's elimination, Fukui returned to Skënderbeu along with his teammates, and made his first appearance on 25 August in the 2016 Albanian Supercup, scoring the temporary equalizer with a header in an eventual 1–3 defeat to Kukësi at Selman Stërmasi Stadium. He made his first league appearance in the opening matchday on 7 September by playing full-90 minutes against Flamurtari Vlorë in an eventual 2–1 home win. After playing as a starter in the first matches, Fukui lost his place by the beginning of November, recording 94 minutes until January. In January, the new manager convinced him to stay for the second part of season, but nevertheless, he played only two league matches.

Kamza
On 3 August 2017, after a failed season at Skënderbeu, Fukui signed for newly promoted side Kamza as a free agent. He wasn't part of the team during their winter training camp in Antalya, Turkey due to having visa problems; he instead trained with Kastrioti Krujë and played in one friendly.

Fukui was one of the most used players in the Kamza squad during the 2017–18 season, making 33 league appearances, scoring no goals as the team avoided relegation only in the final matchday. He left the club initially during the summer transfer window, and also claiming that the club had not paid him correctly, however, on 31 August he returned and signed a contract for the 2018–19 season.

He scored his league goal of in his first appearance the new season on 15 September against Kastrioti Krujë, netting the second to help the team win 2–0.

Club statistics

Honours
Sutjeska
Montenegrin First League: 2013–14

References

External links

1988 births
Living people
Nippon Bunri University alumni
Association football people from Tottori Prefecture
Japanese footballers
Association football forwards
Gainare Tottori players
Home United FC players
FK Sutjeska Nikšić players
KF Tirana players
KF Skënderbeu Korçë players
FC Kamza players
J2 League players
Singapore Premier League players
Kategoria Superiore players
Japanese expatriate footballers
Expatriate footballers in Singapore
Expatriate footballers in Montenegro
Expatriate footballers in Albania
Japanese expatriate sportspeople in Albania